Rhapsody Rabbit is a 1946 American animated comedy short film in the Merrie Melodies series, directed by Friz Freleng and featuring Bugs Bunny. The short was originally released to theaters by Warner Bros. Pictures on November 9, 1946. This short is a follow-up of sorts to Freleng's 1941 Academy Award-nominated short Rhapsody in Rivets, which featured the "Hungarian Rhapsody No. 2" by Franz Liszt. The "instrument" used to perform the "Hungarian Rhapsody" in Rhapsody in Rivets is a skyscraper under construction, while this short features Bugs playing the piece at a piano, while being pestered by a mouse.

In 1946, film critic James Agee wrote in The Nation that the short is "the funniest thing I have seen since the decline of sociological dancing," saying, "The best of it goes two ways: one, very observant parody of concert-pianistic affectations, elegantly thought out and synchronized; the other, brutality keyed into the spirit of the music to reach greater subtlety than I have ever seen brutality reach before."

Rhapsody Rabbit was the first cartoon to be broadcast on Cartoon Network when the channel launched on October 1, 1992.

Plot

Following a bar of "Merrily We Roll Along" and a segment of the "lively" portion of Wagner's Siegfried funeral march, Bugs Bunny walks onstage to applause and prepares to play the grand piano. Throughout the cartoon, he runs through a large assortment of visual gags while continuing to play the Hungarian Rhapsody.

The first involves an (off-screen) audience member who coughs and hacks loudly just as Bugs is poised to play. After a second time, Bugs whips out a revolver from his tailcoat and shoots the audience member to shut them up. He then resumes the concert.

Although the short is primarily pantomime, Bugs speaks a few times. At one point, he is interrupted by a phone ring, timed to echo a short fluttering strain that Bugs is playing at that moment. The phone is inside the piano: "Eh, what's up, doc? Who? Franz Liszt? Never [heard] of him. Wrong number." When playing a repeated, descending three-note sequence (which happens to be the same three-note sequence (Mi-Re-Do) notably used in the unrelated Rossini aria "Largo al factotum" from The Barber of Seville, which would be spoofed in a later Bugs cartoon), Bugs accompanies his piano playing by singing, "Fi-ga-ro! Fi-ga-ro!"

A mouse appears and pesters Bugs the rest of the way, although the first ("slow") half is played nearly "straight", with but a few small gags. Bugs stops at the very short pause, acknowledging the audience's applause. Before he can begin the "fast" part (where the gags accelerate), the mouse instigates a major musical shift, to a "boogie-woogie" number. Bugs joins in, although he eventually traps the mouse (which responds by playing "Chopsticks" while trapped) and seemingly disposes of the pest with dynamite; when the mouse quietly begins "Taps" and stops a note short, Bugs peers inside and the mouse hits the final note by striking Bugs with a mallet. Bugs then returns to the Rhapsody, and as the pace picks up, he addresses the camera (for the last time in the cartoon): "Look! One hand! ... NO hands!" The camera pulls back, and he deftly plays the piano keys with his toes.

Nearing the end of the Rhapsody, Bugs is shocked to find the finale page, which consists of scrambled, quick playing, nearly impossible to read notes after which he takes off his shirt, oils his hands and prays. Then, preparing to play, he is startled by the frenzied finalé behind him. It is the mouse, complete with tie and tails, playing a toy piano that plays like a normal piano. Cut back to Bugs after the full-orchestra finalé, he disgustedly plays the final three single notes, and then mutters to himself in annoyance.

Voice cast
Mel Blanc as Bugs Bunny, Rat and Coughing Audience Member

Home media
The short is available on Looney Tunes Golden Collection: Volume 2, with an optional commentary track by musical historian Daniel Goldmark. It is also available on volume 2 of Looney Tunes Spotlight Collection, as well as the WarnerMedia Entertainment video streaming service HBO Max.

Plagiarism dispute
The same year Warner released Rhapsody Rabbit, MGM produced a very similar Tom and Jerry cartoon called The Cat Concerto, which features Tom being distracted by Jerry while playing in a concert. Several gags are identical, and both use Hungarian Rhapsody No. 2 as the primary piece. The Cat Concerto won an Academy Award for Best Animated Short Film.

Both MGM and Warner accused each other of plagiarism after both films were shown in the 19th Academy Awards Ceremony. Technicolor was accused of sending a print of either cartoon to a competing studio, who then plagiarized their rival's work. Even today, this remains uncertain: though Rhapsody Rabbit has an earlier MPAA approval number and release date, MGM's cartoons had a longer production period. The massive similarities could also be coincidental. The controversy was addressed in an episode of the Cartoon Network anthology series ToonHeads.

See also
 Looney Tunes and Merrie Melodies filmography (1940–1949)
 List of Bugs Bunny cartoons
 Convict Concerto (1954), a Woody Woodpecker cartoon
 Daffy's Rhapsody (2012), a Daffy Duck and Elmer Fudd cartoon
 Pink, Plunk, Plink (1966), a Pink Panther cartoon
 Mickey Mousing, a film technique that syncs the accompanying music with the actions on screen

References

External links

 

1946 films
1946 short films
1946 animated films
Merrie Melodies short films
Short films directed by Friz Freleng
Animated films about music and musicians
Films scored by Carl Stalling
Bugs Bunny films
1940s Warner Bros. animated short films
Film controversies
Films involved in plagiarism controversies
Films with screenplays by Michael Maltese